Verticordia coronata is a flowering plant in the myrtle family, Myrtaceae and is endemic to the south-west of Western Australia. It is a small shrub with leaves whose shape depends on their position on the plant, and groups of yellow flowers near the ends of the branches.

Description

Flowering time is from September to November.

Taxonomy and naming
Verticordia coronata was first formally described by Alex George in 1991 and the description was published in Nuytsia from specimens collection in the Stirling Range by Alex and Elizabeth George in 1984. The specific epithet (coronata) is derived from the Latin word coronare meaning "to crown", hence "crowned", referring to the shape of the staminodes.

George placed this species in subgenus Chrysoma, section Jugata along with V. chrysanthella, V. brevifolia, V. galeata, V. chrysantha, V. amphigia and V. laciniata.

Distribution and habitat
This verticordia grows in sand, often coarse sand derived from granite, often with other verticordias in heath or shrubland. It occurs in the Stirling Range National Park and nearby areas including Nyabing, Pingrup, Cranbrook and Katanning in the Avon Wheatbelt, Esperance Plains and Mallee biogeographic regions.

Conservation
Verticordia coronata is classified as  "Priority Three" by the Western Australian Government Department of Parks and Wildlife, meaning that it is poorly known and known from only a few locations but is not under imminent threat.

Use in horticulture
Verticordia coronata is a difficult plant to propagate and grow in cultivation and its requirements are not yet known.

References

coronata
Rosids of Western Australia
Eudicots of Western Australia
Plants described in 1991